Maurice Fischer (born in Belgium, died August 20, 1965) was the first Israeli Ambassador to France.  He was Ambassador to Italy from 1961 to 1965 and Minister to Turkey from 1953 until 1957.

Fischer emigrated to Palestine in 1930 and fought in the Free French Forces during World War II.

References

External links
In the Shadow of the Holocaust and the Inquisition
The French Connection

Ambassadors of Israel to France
Ambassadors of Israel to Turkey
Ambassadors of Israel to Italy
1965 deaths
Immigrants to Mandatory Palestine